Mount Cragus or Mount Cragos or Mount Kragos was a mountain in ancient Cilicia, Asia Minor; its location is in modern-day Antalya Province, Turkey.  At its foot was Antiochia ad Cragum.

References

Geography of ancient Cilicia
Cragus (Cilicia)
Landforms of Antalya Province